Versus the World is the fourth full-length studio album by Swedish death metal band Amon Amarth, released on 18 November 2002 by Metal Blade Records and Sony Music. It was also released with a bonus disc featuring the Sorrow Throughout the Nine Worlds EP as well as their two demos; Thor Arise, The Arrival of the Fimbul Winter (the first being unreleased before) and a German version of "Victorious March" entitled "Siegreicher Marsch" which was on Once Sent from the Golden Hall. The song "Death in Fire" was made into a music video. Versus the World was the first Amon Amarth album to showcase a more midpaced and heavy sound, unlike their earlier faster works. A deluxe edition was released in 2009 that featured the album remastered by Jens Bogren, and a bonus cd of the original album played live in its entirety in Bochum, Germany.

When asked to comment on the album, vocalist Johan Hegg remarked:

Reception
In 2005, Versus the World was ranked number 413 in Rock Hard magazine's book of The 500 Greatest Rock & Metal Albums of All Time.

Track listing

Release history

Personnel

Band members
 Johan Hegg – vocals
 Olavi Mikkonen – lead guitar
 Johan Söderberg – rhythm guitar
 Ted Lundström – bass
 Fredrik Andersson – drums

Other
 Produced and engineered by Berno Paulsson.
 Mixed and mastered by Henrik Larsson in September 2002.
 Cover by Tom Thiel and Thomas Everhard

References

Amon Amarth albums
Metal Blade Records albums
2002 albums